Stephen Sedgwick is a British mix engineer best known for his work with Damon Albarn and Gorillaz. He is based at Studio 13 in West London.

Career 
Stephen began his career in 2002 at London's Pierce Rooms. It was at Pierce Rooms in 2004, while working on the second Gorillaz studio album Demon Days, where Stephen first met Damon Albarn. In 2006, Damon invited Stephen to work at the first incarnation of Studio 13 and in 2010 Stephen was appointed Head Engineer at the current location near Ladbroke Grove.

Stephen has recorded and mixed each of Damon's albums and music projects since 2004. Stephen has received multiple grammy nominations  and has worked with artists including Amy Winehouse, Benjamin Clementine, Blur, Bobby Womack, Chaka Khan, De La Soul, Erykah Badu, Lana Del Rey, Lou Reed, Major Lazer, Massive Attack, Mura Masa, Rex Orange County, Snoop Dogg, The Clash, Tony Allen.

Selected credits

References 

Living people
21st-century British artists
Year of birth missing (living people)
British audio engineers
Gorillaz members